José María López Caño (born 29 March 1939) is a Spanish racing cyclist. He rode in the 1963 Tour de France.

References

External links
 

1939 births
Living people
Spanish male cyclists
Place of birth missing (living people)
Sportspeople from Bilbao
Cyclists from the Basque Country (autonomous community)